Archery competitions at the 2015 Military World Games were held in Mungyeong, South Korea from 5 to 9 October 2015.

Medal summary

Medalists

Recurve

Medal standings

References

Military World Games
2015 in South Korean sport
Archery
2015